Sable is an American mystery crime drama television series that aired on ABC from November 7, 1987 to January 2, 1988, during the 1987–1988 season, and is based on the comic book, Jon Sable: Freelance, by Mike Grell. Seven episodes of the series aired.

The show was a one-hour adventure/drama about mercenary and vigilante Jon Sable (Lewis Van Bergen), who by day was children's book author Nicholas Fleming. The program ran on Saturdays at 8:00, and aired its final episode on January 2, 1988. Rene Russo had her first television role on the series. Lara Flynn Boyle also had one of her first acting roles playing a kidnapped girl in the series pilot.

KISS frontman Gene Simmons is a fan of the comic and purchased the rights to the series earlier in his career with the hope of turning it into a big action movie with Pierce Brosnan as the lead. Simmons even starred in the lead role in an un-aired pilot for the eventual tv show.

Cast
Lewis Van Bergen as Jon Sable
Rene Russo as Eden Kendell 
Ken Page as Joe "Cheesecake" Tyson 
Holly Fulger as Myke Blackmon
Marge Kotlisky as Cynthia
John Harkins as Thomas Watertson

Episodes

References

External links

1987 American television series debuts
1988 American television series endings
American Broadcasting Company original programming
Television shows based on comics
1980s American drama television series
English-language television shows
Television shows set in Chicago
Neo-noir television series